The 2019 Tokyo car attack was a vehicle-ramming attack that occurred on January 1, 2019, in Tokyo, Japan. Suspect Kazuhiro Kusakabe told authorities he intentionally rammed into pedestrians crowded into narrow Takeshita Street in Harajuku district as a terrorist attack in retaliation for the execution of Aum Shinrikyo doomsday cult members. The  New Year's Day attack left eight injured. A ninth person was also directly injured by the driver. The suspect said he initially planned an arson attack by spreading kerosene with a high-pressure washer at the crowd at the nearby Meiji Shrine but found that vehicles were not permitted there.

Kusakabe was subsequently convicted of attempted murder in connection with the attack. He was sentenced to 18 years in prison.

Attack
The attack occurred early in the morning, shortly after midnight. A car collided with people on Takeshita Street, Harajuku district, Shibuya ward, Tokyo. The incident occurred close to Meiji Shrine, one of the largest Shinto shrines in Japan. The street was closed to traffic at the time due to New Year's celebrations. The perpetrator entered the street through a gap in the police barricade near the end facing Meiji-dori street and drove 140 meters the wrong way down the street, hitting eight men aged 19–51 and then crashing into a building. The vehicle used in the attack was a rental Daihatsu Move with Osaka license plates. The perpetrator fled the scene, but 20 or 30 minutes later, he was found by police in nearby Yoyogi Park.

A 30-liter tank of kerosene was also found inside the vehicle along with a pressure washer. There was no fire reported.

Alleged perpetrator
A 21-year-old man, was arrested by police on suspicion of attempted murder. Media quoted the man as claiming he had committed a terrorist act and deliberately driven his car down the narrow street to protest Japan's system of capital punishment and "in retaliation for execution of Aum cult members".

Asahi.com reported that Kusakabe says he staged the attack "in retaliation for the death penalty system."

Police told several media outlets that they were investigating a link between Kusakabe and a doomsday cult, formerly known as Aum Shinrikyo which was responsible for the 1995 Tokyo subway sarin attack.

According to Asahi, the suspect said to police that he had prepared for an arson attack "I planned to set fire by spreading kerosene with the high-pressure washer, targeting a crowd at Meiji Shrine". However police suspect he changed his plan after finding that vehicles were not permitted at the shrine due to the high volume of visitors.

Victims
Eight men, aged 19–51, were injured by the car collision, with the 19-year-old remaining in critical condition as of January 3, 2019. The ninth victim was a man who was mildly injured when the alleged perpetrator struck him while getting out of his vehicle.

See also
 Akihabara massacre

References

2019 crimes in Japan
2019 road incidents
2019 in Tokyo
2010s road incidents in Asia
Attacks in Asia in 2019
Crime in Tokyo
January 2019 crimes in Asia
January 2019 events in Japan
Road incidents in Japan
Vehicular rampage in Asia
Violence in Japan
Attacks during the New Year celebrations
Terrorist incidents in Japan in 2019
Attacks in Japan
Massacres in Japan
Terrorist incidents in Tokyo